Hidenori Tanoue (田上 秀則, born March 20, 1980) is a Japanese former professional baseball catcher in Japan's Nippon Professional Baseball. He played for the Chunichi Dragons from 2002 to 2004 and for the Fukuoka SoftBank Hawks from 2006 to 2013.

External links

NPB stats

1980 births
Living people
People from Osaka
Japanese baseball players
Nippon Professional Baseball catchers
Chunichi Dragons players
Fukuoka SoftBank Hawks players